Tyrannoraptora is a clade defined as "all descendants of the last common ancestor of Tyrannosaurus rex and Passer domesticus (the house sparrow)". The clade was named in 1999 by the American paleontologist Paul Sereno, though in his original concept had Tyrannosauroidea being the sister taxon to Pennaraptora (which in  Serenos paper was synonyms with Maniraptora as Therizinosaurs were thought to be more closely related to Ornithomimosaurs and the term Pennaraptora had not been coined as yet). Phylogenetic analyses have since, however, found the group also encompasses Compsognathidae, Ornithomimosauria, Alvarezsauroidea, and Therizinosauria. Thus tyrannoraptorans are divided into tyrannosauroids and maniraptoromorphs.

The cladogram below shows Sereno's original concept for Tyrannoraptora. 

The Cladogram below shows the modern interpretation of Tyrannoraptora.

References

 
Late Jurassic dinosaurs
Cretaceous dinosaurs
Cenozoic dinosaurs
Extant Middle Jurassic first appearances
Taxa named by Paul Sereno